Richard Platt may refer to 

Richard Platt (writer) (born 1953), English writer 
Richard Platt (brewer) (died 1600), master brewer and philanthropist 
Richard Platt (military officer) (1754–1830), American soldier

See also
Dick Platt, English footballer